The CMLL International Gran Prix (1996) was a lucha libre, or professional wrestling, tournament produced and scripted by the Mexican professional wrestling promotion Consejo Mundial de Lucha Libre (CMLL; "World Wrestling Council" in Spanish) which took place on July 5, 1996, in Arena México, Mexico City, Mexico, CMLL's main venue. The 1996 International Gran Prix was the third time CMLL has held an International Gran Prix tournament since 1994. All International Gran Prix tournaments have been a one-night tournament, always as part of CMLL's Friday night CMLL Super Viernes shows.

The third International Gran Prix followed the format of the first two Gran Prix tournaments by featuring a one night, 16-man single elimination tournament consisting of Mexican natives and foreign-born wrestlers, some of which worked for CMLL on a regular basis and others who were invited specially for the tournament (such as Tiger Mask IV). The final match saw El Hijo del Santo defeat The Great Sasuke from Michinoku Pro to win the International Gran Prix.

Production

Background
In 1994 the Mexican  professional wrestling promotion Consejo Mundial de Lucha Libre (CMLL) organized their first ever International Gran Prix tournament. The first tournament followed the standard "single elimination" format and featured sixteen wrestlers in total, eight representing Mexico and eight "international" wrestlers. In the end Mexican Rayo de Jalisco Jr. defeated King Haku in the finals to win the tournament. In 1995 CMLL brought the tournament back, creating an annual tournament held every year from 1995 through 1998 and then again in 2002, 2003 and finally from 2005 through 2008.

Storylines
The CMLL Gran Prix show  featured fifteen professional wrestling matches scripted by CMLL with some wrestlers involved in scripted feuds. The wrestlers portray either heels (referred to as rudos in Mexico, those that play the part of the "bad guys") or faces (técnicos in Mexico, the "good guy" characters) as they perform.

Tournament

Tournament overview

Tournament brackets

Tournament show

References

1996 in professional wrestling
CMLL International Gran Prix